Choo Sung-Ho (born 26 August 1987) is a South Korean football player, who currently played for Korea National League club Gimhae City FC as a defender. He formerly played for K-League side Busan I'Park.

Club career

Choo joined Busan I'Park as a draft pick from Dong-A University for the 2010 K-League season.  Choo scored the first goal of his professional career in his debut match for his new club, a league match against Jeonbuk Motors on 31 July 2010.

Club career statistics
As of 8 January 2014

References

External links

1987 births
Living people
Association football defenders
South Korean footballers
Busan IPark players
K League 1 players
Korea National League players